Dichomeris lushanae is a moth in the family Gelechiidae. It was described by Kyu-Tek Park and Ronald W. Hodges in 1995. It is found in Taiwan.

The length of the forewings is 9.5–10 mm. The forewings are yellowish ochreous, but pale brownish grey along the anterior margin. There is a small stigma just beyond the middle of the cell and another large one near the end of the cell. The hindwings are grey.

References

Moths described in 1995
lushanae